Tell Me What You Know is the fifth studio album and seventh overall album from Christian singer and songwriter Sara Groves, and it released on November 6, 2007 by INO Records. The producer on the album is Brown Bannister. This release became critically acclaimed and commercially successful.

Critical reception

Tell Me What You Know garnered critical acclaim from music critics. At Christianity Today, Russ Breimeier rated the album five stars, stating that the album is a "natural progression" for the artist, and that this album is not for everyone but noting this should make you a fan of hers if you ever will be. Andree Farias of Allmusic rated the album four stars, saying that the release "deserves a mention, if not for its overall uniqueness, then for continuing to solidify Groves as one of the most important, consistent Christian singer/songwriters of the new millennium." At CCM Magazine, Deborah Evan Price rated the album four stars, writing that "Sara Groves serves up a compelling collection of songs that strikes the difficult balance between education, inspiration and entertainment."

Mike Rimmer of Cross Rhythms rated the album ten out of ten squares, exclaiming that "Sara Groves is a true artist and the compositions here, with their recurrent themes of compassion for the broken and marginalised are surely the best this passionate crafter of songs has ever penned." At Christian Broadcasting Network, Jennifer E. Jones rated the album four spins, writing that this is "Groves at her best". The Phantom Tollbooth's Bert Saraco rated the album five tocks, commenting that the release "establishes Sara Groves as a dependable artist of consistent quality", and that "This is simply a wonderful project that should convince any listener that Sara Groves is a compelling, important artist who needs to be heard by a wider audience, and has perhaps just given us one of the best albums of the year." At New Release Tuesday, Kevin Davis rated the album five stars, stating that it was quite refreshing "her music, lyrics, overall songwriting and singing voice actually all seem to get better with each release."

Commercial performance
For the Billboard charting week of November 24, 2007, Tell Me What You Know was the No. 194 most sold album in the entirety of the United States by The Billboard 200, and it was the No. 14 most sold album in the Christian music market via the Christian Albums position. Also, it was the No. 2 Heatseekers Album, which is the breaking-and-entry chart.

For the Billboard charting week of May 17, 2008, the album was the No. 1 most sold album in the Christian music market via the Christian Albums chart placement. The very next week of May 24, 2008, the album charted in the entirety of the United States via The Billboard 200 at No. 72.

Track listing

Charts

References

2007 albums
Sara Groves albums
INO Records albums
Albums produced by Brown Bannister